Joseph E. Gantman (April 5, 1922 – December 26, 2017) was an American television producer. He produced television programs including Hawaii Five-O, Mission: Impossible, Movin' On, The Dukes of Hazzard, Young Dr. Kildare and Voyage to the Bottom of the Sea.

In 1967 and 1968 Gantman won Primetime Emmy Awards in the category Outstanding Drama Series for the series Mission: Impossible  He died in December 2017 in Santa Monica, California, at the age of 95.

References

External links 

1922 births
2017 deaths
People from Santa Ana, California
American producers
American television producers
Primetime Emmy Award winners